Milena Vukotić (Cyrillic: Милена Вукотић) may refer to:

 Milena of Montenegro (1848–1923), Queen consort of Montenegro from 1860 to 1918
 Milena Vukotic (born 1935), Italian former ballerina and actress